Mosa was an international football player and former coach of the Madagascar national football team. He died on 1 August 2013. He was 65.

References 

Malagasy footballers
Madagascar international footballers
Malagasy football managers
Madagascar national football team managers
2013 deaths
Year of birth missing
Association footballers not categorized by position